Arthur Vere Harvey, Baron Harvey of Prestbury,  (31 January 1906 – 5 April 1994) was a senior Royal Air Force officer and a British Conservative politician who served as a Member of Parliament (MP) for 26 years.

Early life and Second World War
Harvey was educated at Framlingham College, Suffolk and served with the Royal Air Force 1925–30 and during the Second World War. He was an advisor to the Southern Chinese Air Forces 1932–35 and a squadron leader in the Auxiliary Air Force in 1937. He founded the No. 615 (County of Surrey) Squadron and commanded it through the Battle of France. He was appointed a Commander of the Order of the British Empire in 1942. He later became a company chairman and director of several firms.

Member of Parliament
Harvey was selected as the Conservative candidate for Macclesfield after the previous candidate Guy Gibson was killed in action. Harvey was elected as Member of Parliament for Macclesfield in 1945, and held the seat in seven further general elections. He was knighted in 1957. 
In the Commons, Harvey was chairman of the backbench 1922 Committee from 1966 to 1970.  On 14 October 1969 he was made an Honorary Freeman of the Borough of Macclesfield.

Harvey was created a life peer as Baron Harvey of Prestbury, of Prestbury in the County Palatine of Chester on 1 May 1971. He was succeeded as MP in the subsequent by-election by fellow-Conservative, Nicholas Winterton.

Family and later life
He was married three times. 
 in 1940 to Jacqueline Dunnett (two sons, marriage dissolved 1954) 
 in 1955 Mrs Hilary Williams (died 1978; marriage dissolved 1977) 
 in 1978 Mrs Carol Cassar-Torreggiani; three adopted daughters.

He died at St Martin's Port, Guernsey 5 April 1994.

Arms

Notes

External links

 

|-
 

|-

 

|-

 

1906 births
1994 deaths
Chairmen of the 1922 Committee
Commanders of the Order of the British Empire
Harvey of Prestbury, Arthur Harvey, Baron
Conservative Party (UK) MPs for English constituencies
People educated at Framlingham College
Royal Air Force air commodores
Royal Air Force personnel of World War II
UK MPs 1945–1950
UK MPs 1950–1951
UK MPs 1951–1955
UK MPs 1955–1959
UK MPs 1959–1964
UK MPs 1964–1966
UK MPs 1966–1970
UK MPs 1970–1974
UK MPs who were granted peerages
Life peers created by Elizabeth II